Abhishek Rijal (born 29 January 2000) is  a Nepali professional footballer who plays as a forward for Aizawl FC in the I-League and the Nepal national team.

Club career 
Rijal played for the Nepal Police football club. He was one of the young prospects there then he was loaned to Manang Marsyangdi and went on to scoring in AFC Cup and become the first Nepali Footballer to score in AFC Cup. With Kolkata based Mohammedan Sporting, he won the 2019–20 I-League 2nd Division tournament and helped the team qualifying for the 2020–21 I-League season. He currently plays in the I-League for Aizawl FC in India.

International career 
Rijal played his first match in international level against Malaysia as a substitute then he played his first match as a starter against Chinese taipei and went on to scoring in that match.

Career statistics

International

International goals 

Scores and results list Nepal's goal tally first.

Honours

Nepal U-23
South Asian Games 
 Champions (1): 2019

Mohammedan SC
I-League 2nd Division
 Champions (1): 2019–20

Awards
ANFA Award 2075 : Emerging player of the year

References 

Living people
2000 births
Nepalese footballers
Nepal international footballers
Association football forwards
Machhindra F.C. players
Nepalese expatriate sportspeople in India
South Asian Games gold medalists for Nepal
South Asian Games medalists in football